Alan Louis Zaslove (December 9, 1927 – October 2, 2019) was an American animator, producer and director of animated series.

Career 
He started in 1943 as an "office boy" for Leon Schlesinger Productions and went on to work for United Productions of America. He did animation for Gerald McBoing-Boing and Mr. Magoo. Zaslove has also worked on several other cartoons in film and TV such as The Alvin Show, Roger Ramjet, Popeye the Sailor, The Famous Adventures of Mr. Magoo, A Charlie Brown Christmas, The Phantom Tollbooth, CBS Library, A Chipmunk Christmas, Freedom 2000, Fractured Fairy Tales, George of the Jungle, Carnival of the Animals, The Hoober-Bloob Highway, Tom Thumb, The Night Before Christmas, Clerow Wilson and the Miracle of P.S. 14 and Stanley the Ugly Duckling. 

At Hanna-Barbera, Zaslove worked on several of their works such as Space Stars, Yogi's Treasure Hunt, Paw Paws, The Smurfs, The 13 Ghosts of Scooby-Doo, The Challenge of the GoBots, Snorks, the 1985 revival of The Jetsons, the 1985 animated film of Pound Puppies, and Galtar and the Golden Lance. 

During Zaslove's time at Disney, he produced and directed several animated television shows and direct-to-video films including DuckTales, Aladdin, Adventures of the Gummi Bears, Darkwing Duck, Chip 'n Dale Rescue Rangers (which he co-created with Tad Stones), The Return of Jafar, Jasmine's Enchanted Tales: Journey of a Princess and Pocahontas 2: Journey to a New World. He shared Daytime Emmy Award nominations for that and for work on Darkwing Duck. Zaslove also worked as a supervising producer and director on The New Woody Woodpecker Show.

Death 
Zaslove died on October 2, 2019, at the age of 91.

References

External links
 

1927 births
2019 deaths
Animators from New York (state)
American television producers
American film producers
American television directors
American film directors
American animated film directors
American animated film producers
 Nickelodeon Animation Studio people
Hanna-Barbera people
Warner Bros. Cartoons people